Veleso is a comune (municipality) in the Province of Como in the Italian region Lombardy, located about  north of Milan and about  northeast of Como.

Veleso borders the following municipalities: Bellagio, Lezzeno, Nesso, Zelbio.

Demographic evolution

References

Cities and towns in Lombardy